The Atlas was a weekly newspaper published in England from 1826 to 1869.

History

The newspaper was founded by Robert Stephen Rintoul in London in 1826.   Describing itself as "a general newspaper and journal of literature", the Atlas initially 
distinguished itself from its rivals both by the size of paper it used (it boasted of being printed on "the largest sheet ever issued from the press") and by its price (one shilling, almost double that of comparable journals).  The price was gradually reduced (10 d in 1828, 8d in 1846, falling to 2d by 1858).  In the late 1850s, publication was taken over by the United Kingdom Alliance, a 
Manchester-based pro-temperance organization.  The title was changed to The Englishman between 1862 and 1865, before reverting to The Atlas.  During 1869, the final year of its operation, its name changed to The Atlas and Public Schools Chronicle and finally The Public Schools Chronicle for the remainder of that year.

Content

The newspaper supported the Whigs, (later Liberals).  Noted contributors included William Hazlitt, Leigh Hunt, Louis Kossuth, and George Henry Lewes.

Notes

References
 "Atlas (1826-1869)", in Brake (ed.), Dictionary of Nineteenth-century Journalism in Great Britain and Ireland (2009).

London newspapers
Publications established in 1826
Publications disestablished in 1869
Defunct newspapers published in the United Kingdom
1826 establishments in England
1869 disestablishments in the United Kingdom